Frederick Gay Carter (February 28, 1888 – February 19, 1956) was an American football and basketball coach and hospital administrator. He served as the head football coach at La Crosse State Normal School—now known  as the University of Wisconsin–La Crosse—from 1912 to 1914 and at the Colorado School of Mines in 1916.  Carter was later president of the American Hospital Association and vice president of development at St. Luke's Hospital in Cleveland, Ohio.  He died there on February 19, 1956.

References

External links
 Sports Reference profile

1888 births
1956 deaths
American hospital administrators
Basketball coaches from Ohio
Colorado Mines Orediggers football coaches
Colorado Mines Orediggers men's basketball coaches
Wisconsin Badgers football coaches
Wisconsin Badgers football players
Wisconsin–La Crosse Eagles football coaches
People from Cuyahoga County, Ohio